Matt Taylor is an English meteorologist and BBC Weather presenter.

Early life
Originally from Blackburn, Lancashire, Taylor was raised in Glasgow. Taylor has a degree in City and Regional Planning from Cardiff University where he studied before working for a local council in Lincolnshire. In the next couple of years, Taylor took physics and mathematics courses through the Open University in order to improve his chances of gaining a place on the weather-forecasting programme at the Met Office College.

Broadcasting career
Having worked as a Met Office meteorologist since 1998, Matt joined the BBC Weather team in 2004, originally working at the Cardiff weather centre. He now broadcasts across a range of BBC outlets, including BBC One, BBC News, BBC World News, Radio 1, Radio 2, Radio 4 and 5 Live. He is a regular weather forecaster on BBC Breakfast, mainly at the weekends and often forecasts for Radio 4's Today.

References

External links
 Matt Taylor profile BBC Weather

BBC weather forecasters
BBC World News
Living people
Alumni of Cardiff University
People from Blackburn
Year of birth missing (living people)